Rugby union in Ghana, and its predecessor the Gold Coast is a minor but growing sport with a long history.

Governing body
The Ghana Rugby Football Union is the governing body for the sport.
The Current President of the Union is Gifty Annan Myers and has put a lot of effort into ensuring rugby has a strong framework in Ghana and is also responsible for Ghana's participation in Competitions.

History
Rugby was first introduced into Ghana when it was a British colony, and many of the players were in the military. Like many minor African rugby nations, the sport is played in and around the capital, Accra, and for a number of years, the sport was dominated by white expatriates, working in oil, and aluminium

In June, 2009, Ghana hosted the first ever North West Africa women's Sevens.

There are also a small number of teams which have been established which include Cape coast RFC and the Accra Warriors which both involve the volunteers from Gap Year companies. Many players from these teams go on to play for the National Side who are making their mark on African Rugby.

See also
 Ghana national rugby union team 
 Confederation of African Rugby
 Africa Cup
 Ghana Rugby League

External links
 IRB Ghana page 
 Rugby in Ghana
 CAR
 Ghana rugby presents awards
 Accra Warriors RFC
 Ghana: Rugby Team Presents Gold to Minister
 Niger retain Africa CAR Development Trophy 
 Rugby in Ghana
 "Islam and Rugby" on the Rugby Readers review

References